Her Father's Keeper is a 1917 American silent drama film directed by Arthur Rosson and Richard Rosson and starring Irene Howley, Jack Devereaux and Frank Currier.

Cast
 Irene Howley as Claire Masters
 Jack Devereaux as Ralph Burnham
 Frank Currier as William Masters
 John Raymond as Business Manager 
 John Hanneford as Detective
 Walter Bussel as Butler

References

Bibliography
 Frederic Lombardi. Allan Dwan and the Rise and Decline of the Hollywood Studios. McFarland, 2013.

External links
 

1917 films
1917 drama films
1910s English-language films
American silent feature films
Silent American drama films
American black-and-white films
Triangle Film Corporation films
Films directed by Arthur Rosson
Films directed by Richard Rosson
1910s American films